Heteristius cinctus, the banded stargazer, is a species of sand stargazer native to the Pacific coast of the Americas from Baja California, Mexico to Ecuador where it can be found on sandy bottoms at depths of from . This species is currently the only known member of its genus.

References

External links
 Photograph

Dactyloscopidae
Fish of Mexican Pacific coast
Western South American coastal fauna
Fish described in 1916